Yu Lijun, may refer to:

Yu Lijun (water polo player), Chinese water polo player.

Yu Lijun (politician), Chinese politician.